Lestidium australis is a species of fish. It is found in Eastern Australia.

References 

Paralepididae
Marine fish of Western Australia
Taxa named by Hans Hsuan-Ching Ho
Taxa named by Ken Graham
Taxa named by Barry C. Russell
Fish described in 2020